May refer to 
 Sanctuary Records
 Sanctuary Housing